The 2019 Air Force Falcons football team represented the United States Air Force Academy in the 2019 NCAA Division I FBS football season. The Falcons were led by thirteenth-year head coach Troy Calhoun and played their home games at Falcon Stadium in Colorado Springs, Colorado. They competed as members of the Mountain West Conference in the Mountain Division. They finished the season 11–2, 7–1 in Mountain West play to finish in second place in the Mountain Division. Following the season they were invited to the Cheez-It Bowl where they defeated Washington State by a score of 31–21. The 2019 Falcons' 11 wins were the most in a single season under head coach Troy Calhoun, their third 10+ win season during his tenure, their eighth in program history, and the most wins achieved in a single season since the 1998 team who finished ranked #13 in the AP Poll and #10 in the Coaches' Poll with a record of 12–1.

Previous season
The Falcons finished the 2018 season 5–7, 3–5 in Mountain West play to finish in fourth place in the Mountain Division.

Preseason

Award watch lists
Listed in the order that they were released

Mountain West media days
The Mountain West media days were held from July 23−24, 2019 at Green Valley Ranch in Henderson, NV.

Media poll
The preseason poll was released at the Mountain West media days on July 23, 2019. The Falcons were predicted to finish in third place in the MW Mountain Division.

Preseason All−Mountain West Team
The Falcons had two players selected to the preseason All−Mountain West Team, both from the defensive side of the ball.

Defense

Jordan Jackson – DL

Jeremy Fejedelem – DB

Schedule

Source:

Personnel

Coaching staff

 Troy Calhoun also served as a graduate assistant in 1989 and assistant coach for the varsity and junior varsity teams from 1993 to 1994 at Air Force.
 Jake Campbell also served as a graduate assistant at the Air Force Prep School in 1996.
 Steed Lobotzke also served as a graduate assistant at Air Force in 1993.
 Ben Miller also served as a graduate assistant at Air Force from 2002 to 2003.
 John Rudzinski also served as a graduate assistant at Air Force from 2005 to 2007.
 Brian Knorr also served as an assistant coach for the varsity and junior varsity teams from 1992 to 1994 and as a linebackers/safeties/assistant head coach from 2005 to 2007 at Air Force.
 Alex Means also served as a graduate assistant at Air Force in 2014.
 Capt. Andre Morris also served as a graduate assistant at Air Force in 2011.
 Steve Senn also served as a graduate assistant at Air Force in 1991.

Source:

Roster

The Air Force football roster prior to 2019 fall camp (as of July 17, 2019): 
(please note that the Air Force football team rarely lists freshman players on their official roster)

Rankings

Game summaries

Colgate

at Colorado

at Boise State

San Jose State

at Navy

Fresno State

at Hawaii

Utah State

Army

at Colorado State

at New Mexico

Wyoming

vs. Washington State – Cheez-It Bowl

Source for Match-up Records:

Notes

References

Air Force
Air Force Falcons football seasons
Guaranteed Rate Bowl champion seasons
Air Force Falcons football